Allocasuarina is a genus of trees in the flowering plant family Casuarinaceae.  They are endemic to Australia, occurring primarily in the south. Like the closely related genus Casuarina, they are commonly called sheoaks or she-oaks.

Wilson and Johnson distinguish the two very closely related genera, Casuarina and Allocasuarina on the basis of:
Casuarina: the mature samaras being grey or yellow-brown, and dull; cone bracteoles thinly woody, prominent, extending well beyond cone body, with no dorsal protuberance;
Allocasuarina: the mature samaras being red-brown to black, and shiny; cone bracteoles thickly woody and convex, mostly extending only slightly beyond cone body, and usually with a separate angular, divided or spiny dorsal protuberance.

Description
They are trees or shrubs that are notable for their long, segmented branchlets that function as leaves.  Formally termed cladodes, these branchlets somewhat resemble pine needles, although sheoaks are flowering plants. The leaves are reduced to minute scales encircling each joint. Fallen cladodes form a dense, soft mat beneath sheoaks, preventing the development of undergrowth (a phenomenon known as allelopathy) and making sheoak woods remarkably quiet.

Another characteristic feature are the spiny "cones", about the size of an acorn but with a texture more resembling a conifer cone. However, sheoak "cones" are a woody fruit.

As with legumes, sheoak roots possess nodules containing symbiotic nitrogen fixing bacteria; together with their highly drought-adapted foliage, this enables sheoaks to thrive in very poor soil and semi-arid areas. However, sheoaks are much less bushfire-tolerant than eucalypts.

Fossils of closely related species have been found dating back to the time of Gondwana.

Uses 
The hard wood and rich texture makes sheoak wood popular among wood-turners. Sheoak wood is also regarded as an excellent firewood as it burns with very little ash.

Because of its ability to grow and develop extensive root systems in very poor or sandy soils, and to completely cover the ground with its "needles", it is often used to stabilise soils in erosion prone areas, or on sand dunes. Sheoak is also used as an ornamental shrub, although for this purpose the mat of "needles" may become a nuisance and must be carefully considered.

List of species 
Allocasuarina comprises the following species:

 Allocasuarina acuaria
 Allocasuarina acutivalvis
 Allocasuarina brachystachya
 Allocasuarina campestris (tamma)
 Allocasuarina corniculata
 Allocasuarina crassa (Cape Pillar sheoak)
 Allocasuarina decaisneana (Desert oak)
 Allocasuarina decussata (Karri oak)
 Allocasuarina defungens
 Allocasuarina dielsiana (Northern sheoak)
 Allocasuarina diminuta
 Allocasuarina distyla (Scrub sheoak)
 Allocasuarina drummondiana
 Allocasuarina duncanii (Duncan's sheoak)
 Allocasuarina emuina (Emu Mountain sheoak)
 Allocasuarina eriochlamys
 Allocasuarina fibrosa (Woolly sheoak)
 Allocasuarina filidens (Mount Beerwah sheoak)
 Allocasuarina fraseriana (Western sheoak)
 Allocasuarina glareicola
 Allocasuarina globosa
 Allocasuarina grampiana
 Allocasuarina grevilleoides
 Allocasuarina gymnanthera
 Allocasuarina helmsii
 Allocasuarina huegeliana (Rock sheoak)
 Allocasuarina humilis (Dwarf sheoak)
 Allocasuarina hystricosa Wege
 Allocasuarina inophloia (Hairy oak)
 Allocasuarina lehmanniana (Dune sheoak)
 Allocasuarina littoralis (Black sheoak)
 Allocasuarina luehmannii (Bull-oak or buloke)
 Allocasuarina mackliniana (Western sheoak)
 Allocasuarina media
 Allocasuarina microstachya
 Allocasuarina misera
 Allocasuarina monilifera
 Allocasuarina muelleriana (Slaty sheoak)
 Allocasuarina nana
 Allocasuarina ophiolitica
 Allocasuarina paludosa (Scrub sheoak)
 Allocasuarina paradoxa
 Allocasuarina pinaster
 Allocasuarina portuensis
 Allocasuarina pusilla (Dwarf sheoak)
 Allocasuarina ramosissima
 Allocasuarina rigida
 Allocasuarina robusta
 Allocasuarina rupicola
 Allocasuarina scleroclada
 Allocasuarina simulans
 Allocasuarina spinosissima
 Allocasuarina striata (Small bull-oak)
 Allocasuarina tessellata
 Allocasuarina thalassoscopica
 Allocasuarina thuyoides (Horned she-oak)
 Allocasuarina tortiramula (Twisted sheoak)
 Allocasuarina torulosa (Forest sheoak)
 Allocasuarina trichodon
 Allocasuarina verticillata (Drooping sheoak)
 Allocasuarina zephyrea

Species names with uncertain taxonomic status
The status of the following species is unresolved:
 Allocasuarina decemilinanana

References

External links

 

 Research team from IRD working on Casuarinaceae

 
Fagales genera
Fagales of Australia